Tórður Thomsen (born 11 June 1986) is a Faroese international footballer who plays for Faroese side B36 Tórshavn as a goalkeeper.

Career
Born in Runavík, Thomsen began his senior career in 2005 with NSÍ Runavík, and has also played for ÍF Fuglafjørður, B68 Toftir and Argja Bóltfelag.

Thomsen made his international debut in 2010.

In 2012, he signed a contract with Danish side S.C. Egedal.
In 2013, he returned home to the islands, and signed for B36 Tórshavn.

External links

References

1986 births
Living people
People from Runavík
B36 Tórshavn players
Faroese footballers
Faroe Islands international footballers
Association football goalkeepers
Faroe Islands youth international footballers